Valli is a 1993 Indian Tamil-language drama film directed by K. Natraj, written and produced by Rajinikanth, who also stars in extended guest lead role. It stars Hariraj and Priya Raman as the main leads, with Vadivelu playing the comedian and newcomer Sanjay as the main antagonist. The film's music was scored by Ilaiyaraja. Rajinikanth scripted the film, wrote the dialogues and appeared in an extended guest role. The movie was a box office disaster.

Plot
Valli (Priya Raman) returns to her village after studying for 15 years in Madras. Her cousin (Hariraj) celebrates her arrival back to the village. He was in love with Valli since childhood days, but she has changed after she went to study in the city. She is no more in love with him. She falls in love with a city guy called Shekar (Sanjay), who comes to the village with his friends for hunting. Shekar has slept with Valli promising to marry her, but cheats her and he escapes to the city. It is then found out that he is the only son of the chief minister of the state. Later, after widespread protests, Shekar is brought back by Valli's cousin. Instead of marrying Shekar, she kills him for cheating her. She is put in jail for 10 years. Finally when she returns home, she finds her wedding hall ready with pomp and fun for her marriage with her cousin. Her marriage is arranged by Veeraiya Valliyappan (Rajinikanth) and Shiva (Vadivelu), who know her terrible past. She thanks them for wholeheartedly helping her.

Cast
 Priya Raman as Valli
 R. Dilip
 Vadivelu as Shiva
 Hariraj as Velu
 Sanjay as Shekar
 Alex
 Pradeep Shakthi
 Rajinikanth as Valliyappan Veeraiya (Extended cameo appearance)

Production
K. Natraj, Rajinikanth's friend from university, who earlier directed Anbulla Rajinikanth, was approached by Rajinikanth to take part as an assistant director in Annamalai, to which Natraj gladly accepted. Then Rajinikanth approached his friends and announced that he would like to make a film for them. The script of Valli was written by Rajinikanth himself. Rajinikanth revealed that the first thing came to his mind while scripting the film was the climax. He imagined that the girl should kill the boy who destroyed her life, as opposed to the typical cliche of Tamil films where the rape victim is made to marry the rapist, he also revealed that he had completed writing the screenplay within 7 days. Priyaraman made her debut as heroine, while Hariraj and Sanjay were introduced in this film. Rajinikanth was not interested to appear in a cameo appearance, but with insistence of his friends, he accepted to do the small role and finished his portions within five days.

Shooting began in April 1993 and ended around June-July that year. The film marked the acting debut of magician Alex as actor. The filming was held at Chalakudy, Pollachi and Red Hills. Hari, director of Saamy and Singam was one of the assistants in this film.

Soundtrack
The music was composed by Ilaiyaraja. The song "Ennulle Ennulle" remains one of the popular songs from this film.

Reception
The Indian Express wrote "The story has shades of 16 Vayathinile but has a freshness in its neatly etched screenplay."

The profits of Valli was shared by Rajinikanth's friends including director Ravindranath and Kannada film actor Ashok, who received 10 lakh rupees each.

References

External links
 

1993 films
Films scored by Ilaiyaraaja
1990s Tamil-language films
Indian drama films
Films shot in Chalakudy
1993 drama films
Films shot in Thrissur